Caucasian tur may refer to either of two species of mountain-dwelling goat-antelopes of the genus Capra:

East Caucasian tur, which lives exclusively in the eastern half of the Caucasus Mountains
West Caucasian tur, which lives exclusively in the western half of the Caucasus Mountains

Animal common name disambiguation pages